Ramanathapuram railway station is a railway station serving the town of Ramanathapuram in Tamil Nadu, India.

The station is a part of the Madurai railway division of the Southern Railway zone and connects the city to various parts of the state as well as the rest of the country.

Location and layout
The railway station is located off the Railway Feeder Rd, MSK Nagar, Pasumpon Nagar of Ramanathapuram.

Lines
The station is a focal point of the historic main line that connects Chennai with places like , Bhubaneswar, Madurai, Manamadurai, Mayiladuthurai, Tiruchirappalli, Coimbatore, Rameswaram, etc.
 BG single line towards  to Rameswaram.

References

External links
 

Madurai railway division
Railway stations in Ramanathapuram district
Transport in Rameswaram